The Pine Creek biogeographic region, an interim Australian bioregion, (abbreviation PCK) is located in the Northern Territory, and comprises .

The bioregion draws its name from  Pine Creek, and has the code PCK. There is just one subregion (PCK01, identical to the region.

See also

Geography of Australia

References

Further reading
 Thackway, R and I D Cresswell (1995) An interim biogeographic regionalisation for Australia : a framework for setting priorities in the National Reserves System Cooperative Program Version 4.0 Canberra : Australian Nature Conservation Agency, Reserve Systems Unit, 1995. 

Arnhem Land tropical savanna
IBRA regions